Photomath is a mobile computer algebra system with an augmented optical character recognition system designed for use with a smartphone's camera to scan and recognize mathematical equations; the app then displays step-by-step explanations onscreen.

The app is based on a text recognition engine developed by Microblink, a company based in London and Croatia, and led by Damir Sabol, which also includes the same people who are developing both Photomath and Photopay. The company Photomath LLC is legally registered in San Mateo, California, and, in 2021, the company announced $23 million in Series B funding led by Menlo Ventures, with participation from GSV Ventures, Learn Capital, Cherubic Ventures and Goodwater Capital.

Description 
Photomath uses the camera on a user's smartphone or tablet to scan and recognize a math problem. Once the problem is recognized, the app will display solving steps, sometimes in a variety of methods or multiple approaches, to explain the scanned problem step-by-step and teach users the correct process. Photomath's in-house math R&D team researches teaching methodologies from around the world, and solutions and solving steps are expert-verified.

In 2016, the app began recognizing handwriting in addition to printed text. Students can now scan textbooks, worksheets, notes, etc.

In 2017, The Tech Edvocate named Photomath among its top 20 teaching and learning apps.

Photomath's main features are generally free of charge. Photomath offers an additional premium subscription, 'Photomath Plus', for users who want extra help, with things like mathematic word problems, or worked textbook solutions.

As of 2021, the app has over 220 million downloads worldwide, with the official website claiming that it solves 2.2 billion problems per month, and that over 1 million teachers use the app.

References

External links
Official Website

Android (operating system) software
IOS software
Photo software
Croatian brands
2014 software
Mobile applications
Mathematical software
Companies based in Zagreb